Parma Creek is a river of the state of New South Wales in Australia.

See also
List of rivers of Australia

References

Rivers of New South Wales